The 1972–73 San Diego Conquistadors season was the 1st season of the San Diego Conquistadors in the American Basketball Association. The Conquistadors were the first and only expansion team of the ABA, made to make the league have 10 teams, with Dr. Leonard Bloom granted a team for $1 million. But a feud with Peter Graham, proprietor of the San Diego Sports Arena due to Graham being bitter for not being granted the team meant that the team would play their games in the 3,200 capacity Peterson Gym. The first game was a Friday night on October 13, 1972 versus the Denver Rockets, which they lost 100–109. The Conquistadors had a 16–26 first half of the season, with a ten-game losing streak in that half. In the second half, they went 21–21, with a nine-game losing streak in there, though they have a five-game winning streak near the end of the season that rose their win total from 25 to 30. The Q's managed to get into the playoffs due to the Dallas Chaparrals losing to the Denver Rockets on March 25. They finished 9th in points scored with 109.0 points per game and 7th in points allowed with 113.2 points per game. They faced off against the Utah Stars in the playoffs, but they were swept in four games.

Roster
12 George Adams – Small forward
14 Henry Bacon – Shooting guard
20 Mike Barrett – Shooting guard
40 Jerry Chambers – Small forward
54 Simmie Hill – Small forward
13 Stew Johnson – Power forward
44 Larry Miller – Shooting guard
55 Gene Moore – Center
52 Craig Raymond – Center
21 Red Robbins – Center
33/42 Garfield Smith – Center
53 Pete Smith – Power forward
22 Oliver Taylor – Shooting guard
23 Chuck Williams – Point guard

Final standings

Western Division

Playoffs
Western Division Semifinals vs. Utah Stars

Conquistadors lose series, 4–0

Awards and honors
1973 ABA All-Star Game selections (game played on February 6, 1973)
Chuck Williams
Stew Johnson

References

External links
 RememberTheABA.com 1972–73 regular season and playoff results
 San Diego Conquistadors page

San Diego Conquistadors
San Diego Conquistadors, 1972-73
San Diego Conquistadors, 1972-73
San Diego Conquistadors